"The Night" is a song from Goodnight Nurse's second studio album, Keep Me On Your Side. It was released as the first single from the album on 4 February 2008 in Australia and New Zealand.

The song has been credited as a "danceable stomp reminiscent of Bloc Party's Flux" after being released on their "second album that surprises with its new-found maturity."

Despite only being a digital release it is the biggest selling single Goodnight Nurse have had, and has been their highest performing song on the New Zealand radio charts.

Track listing
 The Night - 3:06

Charts

References

Songs about nights
2008 singles
Goodnight Nurse songs
Songs written by Joel Little
2007 songs
Warner Music Group singles